Lick Me I'm Delicious is a United Kingdom-based company that produces ice cream and edible mists. The company was founded in 2011.

History
The company was founded in 2011 by food inventor Charlie Harry Francis. In 2014, the company created an edible mist machine which emits flavored mists that taste like various foods and have no calories.

Products
The company produces ice cream with exotic ingredients. One flavour is made with jellyfish protein that retails at over £140 per scoop. The company also sells and rents a machine that produces edible mists in over two hundred flavors.

See also
 List of ice cream brands

References

External links
 

Dairy products companies of the United Kingdom
Ice cream brands
Food and drink companies established in 2011